Pet Pals: Marco Polo's Code, also released simply as Pet Pals, is a 2010 Italian 3D computer-animated children's film directed by Sergio Manfio and Francesco Manfio, from a screenplay by Sergio, Francesco and Anna Manfio. Produced by Gruppo Alcuni, Marco Polo's Code is based on the Pet Pals animated children's television series. It was released in Italian cinemas on 22 January 2010. A sequel, titled Pet Pals in Windland, was released on 27 March 2014.

Premise 
The Pet Pals, armed with a hint of magic, must combine their strengths when the evil Crow Witch tries to drain the canals of Venice.

Voice cast 
The following is the voice cast of the English dubbed version:

David North as Moby
Raphael Siary as Tophat
Ashley Thrill as Diva and the Crow Witch
Shannon Settlemyre as Holly
Steve Rassin as Pio
Marc Matney as Cuncun, Canbaluc and Ambrogio
Steve Vernon as Aldo
Michael Yeager as Rajim

Release 
Pet Pals: Marco Polo's Code was released in Italian cinemas on 22 January 2010 by 01 Distribution. It had an opening gross of $456,236, grossing a total of $994,776. The film was released in Spain on 18 May 2012, and opened with $239,588 for a total gross of $857,407, contributing to its worldwide box office gross of $1,854,941.

Sequel 

A sequel, Pet Pals in Windland, was released on 27 March 2014. It was a co-production between Gruppo Alcuni and LuxAnimation.

References

External links 

2010 films
2010 animated films
2010 3D films
Italian children's films